Drake M. Nevis (born May 8, 1989) is a professional Canadian football defensive tackle for the Toronto Argonauts of the Canadian Football League (CFL). He won the 107th Grey Cup with the Winnipeg Blue Bombers in 2019. Nevis was drafted in the third round of the 2011 NFL Draft by the Indianapolis Colts of the National Football League (NFL) and spent parts of four seasons in the NFL. He played college football for the LSU Tigers.

High school career
Nevis attended John Ehret High School in Marrero, Louisiana, where he recorded 72 tackles (17 for losses), 18 sacks, 25 quarterback hurries, eight forced fumbles and two recovered fumbles as a senior. He received Class 5A first-team all-state honors and a SuperPrep All-American selection. Regarded as a four-star recruit by Rivals.com, Nevis was listed as the No. 9 defensive tackle prospect in the class of 2007.

Professional career

Indianapolis Colts
After a 2-year stint with the Indianapolis Colts, Nevis was released on September 1, 2013.

San Diego Chargers
Shortly after his release from the Colts, the San Diego Chargers claimed him off waivers. Nevis was released on September 17, 2013.

Dallas Cowboys
He signed with the Dallas Cowboys on September 24, 2013. The Cowboys waived Nevis on December 13.

Jacksonville Jaguars
Nevis was signed by the Jacksonville Jaguars on December 23, 2013. He was released on May 12, 2014.

Carolina Panthers
Nevis was claimed off waivers on May 13, 2014 by the Carolina Panthers.

Hamilton Tiger-Cats
Nevis joined the Hamilton Tiger-Cats in 2015, but missed the season with injury. He returned in 2016 to produce 29 tackles and 5 sacks in 14 games played.

Winnipeg Blue Bombers
Nevis signed a two year free agent deal with the Winnipeg Blue Bombers, and signed a one year extension in March 2019. Over these three seasons, Nevis played in 50 games, and impactful as a run-stuffer, making 72 tackles, to go along with 6 sacks. Through the 2019 season Nevis played an important role in a dominant defensive line that built up a reputation, giving up short yardage to the run and putting pressure on the quarterback, led by Willie Jefferson, together with Jackson Jeffcoat, Jake Thomas, and Steven Richardson. Their strong play in the 2019 CFL playoffs saw several stuffs on third down to win the 2019 West Division Final and in the 107th Grey Cup, which they would go on to win, Winnipeg's first championship in 29 years. Nevis recorded one sack in the championship game, as the Bombers defence controlled the match.

Toronto Argonauts
Upon entering free agency, Nevis signed with the Toronto Argonauts on February 12, 2020. He re-signed with the Argonauts on February 2, 2021.

Statistics

CFL

References

External links
 
 Toronto Argonauts bio
 Carolina Panthers bio
 Indianapolis Colts bio
 NFL Combine Profile
 LSU Tigers bio

1989 births
Living people
People from Jefferson Parish, Louisiana
Sportspeople from Thibodaux, Louisiana
Players of American football from Louisiana
American football defensive tackles
American football defensive ends
John Ehret High School alumni
LSU Tigers football players
Indianapolis Colts players
San Diego Chargers players
Dallas Cowboys players
Jacksonville Jaguars players
Carolina Panthers players
American players of Canadian football
Canadian football defensive linemen
Hamilton Tiger-Cats players
Winnipeg Blue Bombers players
Toronto Argonauts players